Jerry Onesemas Pulamte (born 15 March 1999) is an Indian professional footballer who plays as a winger for I-League club Real Kashmir.

Playing career
After training with the Mohun Bagan-affiliated SAIL Academy as a teenager, Pulamte spent the 2017–18 season with Keinou Library & Sports Association (KLASA), a semi-professional club participating in the Manipur State League (MSL). On 10 September 2017, he scored the lone goal in a 1–0 victory over his future club, NEROCA, after just 20 seconds, setting a new MSL record for the quickest goal in league history. In fact, he finished the season as the league's top scorer.

In May 2018, Pulamte signed a two-year contract with I-League club NEROCA. He made his professional debut on 27 October, replacing Manglem Meitei in the 77th minute of a 2–0 defeat to East Bengal.

In September 2022, Pulamte signed with Real Kashmir, returning to the I-League after stints with Wangoi FA, Garhwal and Sagolband United.

Career statistics

Club

Honours

Individual
 Manipur State League top scorer: 2017–18

References

External links
 
 Jerry Pulamte at footballdatabase.eu
 

Living people
1999 births
Indian footballers
Association football forwards
NEROCA FC players
Real Kashmir FC players
I-League players
People from Dima Hasao district
Footballers from Assam